Time Nahi Hai (also known as Life Mein Time Nahi Hai Kisi Ko) is a Hindi film released on 18 October 2019. The film stars Krushna Abhishek, Rajneesh Duggal, Shakti Kapoor, Rajpal Yadav, Yuvika Chaudhary, Govind Namdev, Aanjjan Srivastav, Sunil Pal, Tiku Talsania, Hemant Pandey, Ramandeep Kaur and others.

The film is directed by Manoj Sharma and produced by Manish Rander, Shyamsunder Malani, Rajesh Rander, Vishnu Sharda and Sanjay Garg. Online Marketing by Sudhanshu Kumar. Time Nahi hai has been shot on location in Udaipur, Rajasthan.

Cast
Krushna Abhishek
Rajneesh Duggal
Shakti Kapoor
Rajpal Yadav
Yuvika Chaudhary
Govind Namdev
Aanjjan Srivastav
Sunil Pal
Tiku Talsania
Hemant Pandey
Ramandeep Kaur
Gopi Bhalla

References

External links 
 

2010s Hindi-language films
2019 films
Films directed by Manoj Sharma